Van Den Burgh is a Dutch surname, meaning of the village.  Not to be confused with van den Berg meaning of the mountain. It may refer to:

G. Van Den Burgh, Indonesian footballer
Jane Van Den Burgh (born 1948), American writer
John Van Den Burgh (1872 - 1924), American herpetologist
Shelli Van Den Burgh (born 1969), American politician

Surnames of Dutch origin